CPCC Central Campus is a streetcar station in Charlotte, North Carolina. The at-grade dual side platforms on Elizabeth Avenue are a stop along the CityLynx Gold Line and serves Central Piedmont Community College.

Location 
CPCC Central Campus station is located at the intersection of Elizabeth Avenue and Pease Lane, at Central Piedmont Community College. Nearby is the American Legion Memorial Stadium, Elizabeth Park, Grady Cole Center, Little Sugar Creek Greenway, and Thompson Park.

History 
As part of the initial  Gold Line, construction on CPCC Central Campus began in December 2013. The station opened to the public on July 14, 2015, with a low platform configuration that was used for heritage streetcars. In June 2019, as part of phase two, streetcar service was replaced by the CityLynx Connector bus; at which time the station's two side platforms were closed off so they can be raised to accommodate the level boarding for modern streetcar vehicles. Though it was slated to reopen in early-2020, various delays pushed out the reopening till mid-2021. The station reopened to the public on August 30, 2021, at which time the CityLynx Connector bus was discontinued.

Station layout
The station consists of two side platforms and two passenger shelter; crosswalks and ramps provide platform access from Elizabeth Avenue. Bike lanes, along Elizabeth Avenue, traverse behind the platforms and are marked in green. The station's passenger shelters house two art installations by Nancy O’Neil. The windscreens focuses on education and aspiration as well as development along Little Sugar Creek, featuring a collage of historical maps, photos, and manuscripts on glass.

References

External links
 
 CPCC Inbound
 CPCC Outbound

Lynx Gold Line stations
Railway stations in the United States opened in 2015
Railway stations in North Carolina at university and college campuses